Borek is a municipality and village in České Budějovice District in the South Bohemian Region of the Czech Republic. It has about 1,600 inhabitants.

History
Borek was founded in 1805 and is one of the youngest villages in the region.

References

Villages in České Budějovice District